Stoneville may refer to:

In the United States
 Stoneville, Mississippi
 Stoneville, North Carolina
 Stoneville, South Dakota

Elsewhere
 Stoneville, Western Australia, Australia
 Stoneville, Newfoundland and Labrador, Canada